Viktor Ivanovich Diduk (born 8 July 1957) is a Soviet rower. At the 1988 Summer Olympics, he won a silver medal in the eight.

References

External links
 
 
 

1957 births
Living people
Rowers at the 1988 Summer Olympics
Russian male rowers
Soviet male rowers
Olympic rowers of the Soviet Union
Olympic silver medalists for the Soviet Union
Olympic medalists in rowing
World Rowing Championships medalists for the Soviet Union
Medalists at the 1988 Summer Olympics